Crossgate is a home rule-class city in Jefferson County, Kentucky, United States. The population was 225 at the 2010 census.

Geography
Crossgate is located in northeastern Jefferson County at  (38.279131, -85.629609). It is bordered to the north by Northfield, to the south by Graymoor-Devondale and otherwise by the Louisville/Jefferson County Metro Government. Kentucky Route 22 (Brownsboro Road) runs along the northern edge of the city.

Demographics

At the 2000 census there were 251 people, 98 households, and 77 families living in the city. The racial makeup of the city was 96.02% White, 0.80% Black or African American, 0.40% Native American and 2.79% Asian.
Of the 98 households 34.7% had children under the age of 18 living with them, 72.4% were married couples living together, 5.1% had a female householder with no husband present, and 21.4% were non-families. 19.4% of households were one person and 12.2% were one person aged 65 or older. The average household size was 2.56 and the average family size was 2.94.

The age distribution was 24.3% under the age of 18, 4.8% from 18 to 24, 23.5% from 25 to 44, 31.5% from 45 to 64, and 15.9% 65 or older. The median age was 44 years. For every 100 females, there were 94.6 males. For every 100 females age 18 and over, there were 88.1 males.

The median household income was $66,000 and the median family income  was $74,500. Males had a median income of $57,917 versus $41,250 for females. The per capita income for the city was $31,450. None of the families and 2.4% of the population were living below the poverty line.

References

External links
City of Crossgate official website

Cities in Jefferson County, Kentucky
Cities in Kentucky